Tatiana Alexandrovna Sharanova (born 28 November 1946) is a Russian former pair skater who represented the Soviet Union in the 1960s and early 1970s. Competing in partnership with Aleksandr Gorelik, she won bronze at the 1962 Blue Swords and placed 7th at the 1964 European Championships in Grenoble, France.

Sharanova's partnership with her husband, Anatoli Evdokimov, began by 1966.  The two finished 5th at the 1967 European Championships in Ljubljana, Yugoslavia, and 8th at the 1967 World Championships in Vienna, Austria. They won silver at the 1966 Prize of Moscow News, gold at the 1967 Prague Skate, and silver at the 1970 Blue Swords.

After retiring from competition, Sharanova worked for an ice ballet based in Kiev, Ukraine.

Competitive highlights

With Evdokimov

With Gorelik

References 

1946 births
Russian female pair skaters
Soviet female pair skaters
Living people
Figure skaters from Moscow
Universiade medalists in figure skating
Universiade silver medalists for the Soviet Union
Competitors at the 1968 Winter Universiade